Oak Lawn is a station on Metra's SouthWest Service in Oak Lawn, Illinois. In Metra's zone-based fare system, Oak Lawn is in zone D. As of 2018, Oak Lawn is the 31st busiest of Metra's 236 non-downtown stations, with an average of 1,186 weekday boardings.

As of January 16, 2023, Oak Lawn is served by all 30 trains (15 in each direction) on weekdays. Saturday service is currently suspended.

Trains operate as far north as Chicago Union Station, and as far south as Orland Park and Manhattan.

Bus connections
Pace
 381 95th Street
 395 95th/Dan Ryan CTA/UPS Hodgkins (Weekday UPS shifts only)
 769 Palos Heights/Oak Lawn - Soldier Field Express
 774 Palos Heights/Oak Lawn - Guaranteed Rate Field Express

References

External links

Oak Lawn station and parking deck dedicated (Metra News Release; December 21, 2005)
Station from 95th Street from Google Maps Street View
Station from 52nd Avenue from Google Maps Street View

Metra stations in Illinois
Railway stations in Cook County, Illinois
Station
Railway stations in the United States opened in 1984
Former Wabash Railroad stations